The Quarters of Luxembourg City are the smallest administrative division for local government in Luxembourg City, the capital and largest city in the Grand Duchy of Luxembourg.

There are currently twenty-four quarters, covering the commune of Luxembourg City in its entirety.  They are:

References

See also
 Quarters of Esch-sur-Alzette

 

it:Lussemburgo (città)#Amministrazione e geografia